Galang Hendra Pratama (born in Yogyakarta, 10 March 1999) is an Indonesian motorcycle rider competing in Supersport World Championship. He is the first Indonesian rider to win a motorcycle race on world championship level.

Career

Early career
Pratama started racing at 7 year old in local mini moto championships and motocross. He then switched to road race in early 2010. His achievements on these levels were good, as he won 2013 Motoprix in the beginner class, Yamaha Cup Race round 1 & 2, and Asean Cup Race runner up in MT class. The following year saw him reach runner-up in Indonesian Racing Series (IRS) Underbone 110cc and 3rd in 125cc class. Pratama scored a total of 3 wins in the same classes in 2014 with 2 wins in 125cc class and once in 110cc class. He also competed in Yamaha Sunday Race and finished 9th overall in R25 Pro class.

Pratama participated in 2016 Pekan Olahraga Nasional, representing Special Region of Yogyakarta in Motorcycle Racing. He and Rheza Danica Ahrens earned gold in team 125cc Underbone A Class.

Asia Road Racing Championship
Pratama was recruited by Yamaha Racing Indonesia to compete in Asia Road Racing Championship AP250 class in 2015, aboard a Yamaha YZF-R25. In his maiden season he finished top 10 in the standings, or 9th to be exact. For the following year, the Yogyakarta-born rider earned 2 podiums (2nd in race 2 Thailand 2nd round at Chang International Circuit, and 3rd in 5th round at Buddh International Circuit). He ranked 5th at the end of season.

2017 saw Galang's first win in the AP250 class at round 5 at Madras in race 2. Previously, he finished 3rd in the first race. His victory ended Honda's winning streak at 9. In the overall standings, Pratama ranked 6th.

Pratama was called up to race in 2018 as a replacement of fellow Indonesian Muhammad Faerozi who was out due to an injury. He raced the final round of the season, ranked 8th in the first race and 9th in the second race.

Supersport 300 World Championship

2017
Through Yamaha Indonesia and Yamaha Europe connection, Pratama was sent to Italy to train at Valentino Rossi's VR46 Academy in 2016. He was also selected to race in the World Supersport 300 (WSS300) 2017 as a wildcard at Portimão round in Portugal, aboard a Yamaha YZF-R3. His first race did not go well as he failed to finish.

Pratama earned his second chance to race at round 9 at Jerez. Unexpectedly, he won the race and put himself in the record book as the first Indonesian rider to win a race on world championship level. This achievement raised many eyebrows as he only competed as a wild card and not expected to win the race on his first ever outing at the Spanish race track. He finished 14th in the standings with 25 points from 2 races.

2018
Galang's extraordinary results in the previous season secured him a full-time ride for the following season. He was contracted by BIBLION YAMAHA MOTOXRACING. In the first 2 races, he was struggling to get a decent results but he was able to overcome the issue by finishing top 10 at Imola, and Donington Park. Pratama scored another victory in WSS300 class by finishing first at Brno. In total, he achieved 53 points and reached 10th in the final riders’ standings.

2019
Pratama once again appointed by Yamaha to race in 2019 World Supersport 300, having passed blU crU masterclass selection. He completed the season in 7th position with 64 points.

Supersport World Championship

2020 
After spending 2 full seasons in World Supersport 300, he was confirmed to be promoted to Supersport World Championship alongside French rider Andy Verdoia, racing for bLu cRu Yamaha WorldSSP Team in 2020 season. He was the first Indonesian rider to race in the class since Doni Tata Pradita in 2009 season.

2021 
He moves to Ten Kate Racing for 2021 season to partner Dominique Aegerter.

Personal life 
Galang's parents are Dicky Hestu Prahendra (father) and Desi Prasanti (mother), both are retired motorcycle racers active locally in the 1990s. He is the eldest child of 4 siblings, one of his younger brothers is Aldi Satya Mahendra, also a motorcycle racer who was scheduled to compete in 2020 Asia Talent Cup before the season was cancelled but continues to race in Asia Road Racing Championship. His hobbies outside racing are playing videogames, cycling and music. He was graduated from SMPN 2 Sewon Bantul and SMA Gajah Mada Yogyakarta.

Career statistics

Indoprix

Races by year
(key) (Races in bold indicate pole position; races in italics indicate fastest lap)

Supersport 300 World Championship

Races by year
(key) (Races in bold indicate pole position; races in italics indicate fastest lap)

Supersport World Championship

Races by year
(key) (Races in bold indicate pole position, races in italics indicate fastest lap)

ARRC Supersports 600

Races by year
(key) (Races in bold indicate pole position; races in italics indicate fastest lap)

Mandalika Racing Series

Races by year
(key) (Races in bold indicate pole position; races in italics indicate fastest lap)

References

External links 

 WorldSBK.com Rider Profile

1999 births
Living people
People from Yogyakarta
Javanese people
Indonesian Muslims
Indonesian motorcycle racers
Supersport World Championship riders
Supersport 300 World Championship riders